Bangalore is the capital of the Indian state of Karnataka.

Bangalore may also refer to:

Ships
  was built at Calcutta and was wrecked in the Flores Sea in 1802
  foundered in 1908
 , a steamer involved in the shipwreck of the Prince Rupert; see List of shipwrecks in April 1874
  or Kolkata-class destroyer, a class of stealth destroyer built for the Indian Navy

Other uses
 Bangalore Urban district, Karnataka, India
 Bangalore Rural district, Karnataka, India
 Bangalore torpedo, an explosive charge placed on the end of a long, extendable tube
 Bangalore, a racehorse that finished unplaced in the 1842 Grand National
 Bangalore, one of the playable characters in Apex Legends

See also
 Bangalore Stadium (disambiguation)
 Bangalored, a neologism related to offshoring